The Arkticheskiy Institut Islands or Arctic Institute Islands is a compact archipelago of narrow islands covered with tundra vegetation.

Geography
The main island is called Bolshoy.

The sea surrounding the Arkticheskiy Institut Islands is covered with packed ice in the long winter and the climate is severe. There are numerous ice floes even in the summer.

This island group belongs to the Krasnoyarsk Krai administrative division of the Russian Federation and is part of the Great Arctic State Nature Reserve, the largest nature reserve of Russia.

The Arkticheskiy Institut Islands were named in honor of the Arctic Institute of the USSR, which was then known as "All-Union Arctic Institute". The combination "Arkticheskiy Institut Islands" is technically incorrect, for it is a strange combination of Russian and English. Even so, the name "Arkticheskiy Institut Islands" has become popular and its use has been widespread in this manner for many decades and in many modern maps and atlases. "Arctic Institute Islands", which would be the grammatically correct way of naming these islands in English, is very rarely used.

Sidorova Island was named after Siberian trader and goldmine owner Mikhail K. Sidorov (1823-1887), who had a vision for the development of trade along the Northern Sea Route.

See also
 Kara Sea
 List of islands of Russia

Further reading
William Barr, Reinhard Krause and Peter-Michael Pawlik, The polar voyages of Captain Eduard Dallmann, whaler, trader, explorer 1830–96.

References

External links 

Archipelagoes of the Kara Sea
Islands of Krasnoyarsk Krai